Tauranga City Council is the local government authority for Tauranga City in New Zealand. It is a territorial authority elected to represent the 158,000 people of Tauranga.  The last Mayor of Tauranga was Tenby Powell, who resigned in November 2020. The council consists of 11 members elected from three wards (2 councillors each) and at-large (4 councillors), and is presided over by the Mayor, who is elected at large. Marty Grenfell is currently the CEO of Tauranga City Council.

History
The historic predecessor was Tauranga Borough Council, which existed from 1888 to 1963. Tauranga City Council was then formed and existed from 1963 until the 1989 local government reforms. Post-amalgamation with other authorities in 1989 (e.g. Mount Maunganui Borough Council), Tauranga District Council existed until 2003 when it again became Tauranga City Council.

On 20 November 2020, Mayor of Tauranga Tenby Powell resigned following infighting between himself and city councillors, eight months after he was unanimously censured by his council for an angry outburst. On 18 December 2020, Minister of Local Government Nanaia Mahuta confirmed that the Government would be appointing commissioners to administrate Tauranga in response to infighting within the City Council. The commissioners' terms began in early 2021 and were scheduled to last until the next local elections scheduled for October 2022. The decision to cancel the election for a new mayor and councillors, and the appointment of a crown commission instead by Nanaia Mahuta was not without controversy. A legal opinion by law firm Russell McVeagh found her decision may have been "unlawful." and Tauranga MP Simon Bridges called the decision "dramatic and draconian"  while saying that Powell quitting removed "a significant source of friction" and it was reasonable to assume the council would become more functional with the election of a new Mayor and Councillor.

On 12 March 2022, Mahuta announced that the Tauranga City Council would continue to be administered by four commissioners until July 2024, citing the substantial infrastructure challenges in Tauranga and the surrounding Bay of Plenty region. On 22 April 2022, Mahuta confirmed that the commission's chairwoman Anne Tolley and fellow commissioners Bill Wasley, Stephen Selwood, and Shadrach Rolleston had been reappointed as commissioners with elections postponed until July 2024. While Tauranga City Council chief executive Marty Grenfell and Bay of Plenty Regional Council chairman Doug Leeder welcomed the reappointments on the ground that they ensured continuity, Tauranga Ratepayers' Alliance spokesman Michael O'Neill and former Tauranga Mayor Greg Brownless criticised the extension of the commissioners' terms and called for a return of local democracy. Local Government New Zealand President and Bay of Plenty Regional Councillor, Stuart Crosby labelled the extension of the commission's appointment "disgusting"  while Tauranga MP Simon Bridges cited “power, convenience and control” as the reasons behind Mahuta's decision, and questioned a lack of achievement since the four-person commission was put in place by Labour in February 2021. Victoria University of Wellington public law expert, Dean Knight, said democracy had taken a hit and "should have been restored forthwith."

Elections
The council is normally elected every three years, using the single transferable vote voting system. The vote is conducted by postal ballot. The 2007 election, which closed on 13 October 2007, had a turnout of 40%. Turnouts have since been 38.07% 2010, 37.78% 2013, 43.64% 2016, 40.28% 2019.

Tauranga City Council formerly used the first-past-the-post (FPP) voting system until 2019.

For electoral purposes, Tauranga is divided into three wards and an at-large category. The three metropolitan wards each elect two Councillors each, and the at-large category elects four Councillors.

Party politics are much less influential in elections to the Council than is the case for the House of Representatives. In 2007, the Mayor and a majority of Councillors were elected as independent candidates.

No election was held for the Tauranga City Council during the 2022 local elections, due to the council having been replaced with a commission. The next elections for the city council are instead scheduled for July 2024.

Council

Under most circumstances, the council is presided over by the Mayor. At its first meeting after a local election, the Council elects from among its members a Deputy Mayor, who acts as Mayor in the absence and with the consent, or in the incapacity, of the Mayor. The Deputy Mayor also presides at meetings if the Mayor is not present. The Deputy Mayor serves until losing his set on the council, unless removed from office by a vote of the council.

Councillors also serve on a number of committees. As of 2022, there are four Standing and Special Committees, seven Joint Committees, two advisory groups and two hearings panels. The council can delegate certain powers to these committees, or alternatively they can consider matters in more detail and make recommendations to the full Council.

As of the 2019 local elections, the members of the council were:
       

Since retired.

Organisation
The day-to-day administration of the City of Tauranga is carried out by the Tauranga City Council staff. Indeed, in everyday usage, the term the council is extended to include not just the Mayor and Councillors, but the entire organisation.

The professional head of the city council organisation is the Chief Executive Marty Grenfell, who is appointed by the Council under contract for up to five years. The Chief Executive is assisted by six General Managers, who have a specific portfolio:
 GM Corporate Services – Paul Davidson
 GM People and Engagement – Susan Jamieson 
 GM Strategy and Growth – Christine Jones  
 GM Infrastructure – Nic Johansson
 GM Community Services – Gareth Wallis
 GM Regulatory and Compliance – Barbara Dempsey

General Managers are supported by three director's and a larger group of senior managers. The director's being:
 Director of Transport – TBA
 Director of Waters – Stephen Burton
 Direct of Digital – Alan Lightbourne

The council organisation is about 750 people delivering services across 40 businesses.

The organisation is focused on addressing three critical challenges within the city:
 Housing affordability 
 Predictable travel times
 City Resilience

Responsibilities and services

The council is vested with a power of "general competence" for the social, economic and cultural well-being of Tauranga. In particular, the council has responsibility for a range of local services, including roads (except State highways), water, sewerage, glass recycling, parks and reserves, and libraries. Urban development is managed through the maintenance of a District plan and associated zoning regulations, together with building and resource consents. The council has been given extra powers to regulate certain types of business operations, notably suppliers of alcohol and brothels.

Council business units include:

 Animal control
 Environmental monitoring
 Emergency management
 Waste water
 Storm water
 Drinking water
 Library
 Building services
 Airport
 Marine precinct
 Cemetery
 Rating
 Land surveying
 Transport
 Digital Services
 Democratic Services
 HR
 Legal
 Community relations
 Events management

Waste collection
To dispose of residential waste at the kerbside, residents can choose to either purchase apricot coloured pre-paid bags, black rubbish bags with a pink pre-paid sticker, or hire a wheelie bin from a number of private companies.

To dispose of recyclable material at the kerbside (such as paper, cardboard, plastics number 1 and 2, aluminium cans, tin cans), residents can hire a wheelie bin of either 240-litre size or 140-litre size from a number of private companies.

As of 2018 Tauranga City Council now provides rate-payer funded kerbside collection of glass every fortnight.

As of April 2020 the council will begin to offer kerbside bins and general recycling.

References

External links
 Tauranga City Council official website
 Information page on Tauranga City Council (Useful council information on a single page)

Tauranga
City councils in New Zealand
Politics of the Bay of Plenty Region